De Grey was an electoral district of the Legislative Assembly in the Australian state of Western Australia from 1890 to 1901.

The district was located in the Western Australian outback, in the north of the state. It was one of the original 30 seats contested at the 1890 election but was abolished after three parliamentary terms. In 1898, it included the settlement of Condon together with various pastoral leases along the De Grey, Fortescue and Yule Rivers.

Members for De Grey

Election results

References

De Grey
De Grey
De Grey
Constituencies established in 1890
Constituencies disestablished in 1901